Lucas Covolan Cavagnari (born 6 June 1991) is a Brazilian professional footballer who plays as a goalkeeper for  club Chesterfield, on loan from  club Port Vale.

A Brazil under-20 international, he began his career with Trieste, before turning professional at Vasco da Gama. He later had spells with Atlético Paranaense, Esportivo, Toledo and Rio Branco, winning a Campeonato Acreano title with Rio Branco in 2014. He then spent two years in Spain with Atlético Rafal and Alaró, before joining English club Whitehawk in 2016. He had a loan spell with Lewes and spent two seasons with Worthing, before earning a move to Torquay United in May 2019. He scored a goal in the 2021 National League play-off final, which Torquay lost, before signing with English Football League club Port Vale in June 2021. He helped the club to win promotion out of League Two via the play-offs in 2022. He returned to the National League on a season-long loan with Chesterfield in July 2022.

Early and personal life
Born in Curitiba, Covolan grew up supporting hometown club Atlético Paranaense. He has an Italian passport.

Club career

Brazil
Covolan spent his early career in his native Brazil with Trieste. He was scouted by Vasco da Gama and signed a professional contract at Vasco at the age of 17 after impressing on a two-week trial. He returned from Rio de Janeiro after three years to sign with boyhood club Atlético Paranaense. He later recalled that Atlético had eight goalkeepers on their books and that he realised halfway into his three-year contract that he would never play a first-team game for the club. He tried to gain experience of senior football by leaving on loan, but was injured in a warm-up exercise and sidelined for four months.

Covolan went on to feature four matches as an unused substitute for Esportivo Bento Gonçalves, before joining Toledo in December 2013 and then Rio Branco in March 2014. He helped Rio Branco to win the Campeonato Acreano (Acre state league) in 2014 following a penalty shoot-out victory over Atlético Acreano, but was one of the three players released by the club on 7 May 2014.

Spain
Covolan moved to Spain later in 2014 and joined Tercera División team Atlético Rafal. He switched to fellow Mallorcan side Alaró the next year, making 35 appearances. He spent three months on trial at Mallorca, but was deemed to be too old at the age of 24.

English non-League
In 2016 he was approached by an agent to play for English National League South club Whitehawk, who were managed by the Argentinian Pablo Asensio. He made 23 league appearances for Whitehawk, and also spent a month on loan with Lewes, before signing for Isthmian League Premier Division side Worthing after a pre-season trial. He was named Supporters Player of the Year by Worthing's "Away Boys Fanatics" in the 2017–18 season and had trials at Aldershot Town, Luton Town and Stevenage. He broke his arm during a win at Moneyfields in the FA Cup on 6 October 2018.

Torquay United
He moved to Torquay United in May 2019 after impressing manager Gary Johnson on trial. He competed with Shaun MacDonald for a place in the first-team, but had to wait for his opportunity after picking up an injury in pre-season, making his first-team debut in a 2–1 win at Dover Athletic on 17 August. Covolan would play 25 league games in the 2019–20 season, with MacDonald playing the remaining 11 league matches in a season that was cut short due to the COVID-19 pandemic. He featured 26 times in the 2020–21 campaign, whilst MacDonald played 19 league games, as Torquay qualified for the play-offs with a second-place finish. On 20 June 2021, he scored an injury-time equaliser against Hartlepool United in the National League play-off final, which Torquay eventually lost on penalties, despite two saves from Covolan. His goal earned him comparisons to fellow compatriot Alisson, a goalkeeper who had scored a headed goal for Liverpool earlier in the year; the pair had actually played against each other some years earlier in a tournament for under-23 players when Atlético Paranaense came up against Internacional.

Port Vale
On 23 June 2021, he signed a two-year contract with League Two side Port Vale; manager Darrell Clarke said that "he is hungry to prove he’s a league-level player and we feel he has all the attributes to succeed at this level". Having already been shown a red card in a pre-season friendly, he was sent off on his English Football League debut after rushing off his goal-line to trip Nicke Kabamba during a 1–0 defeat at Northampton Town on 7 August. He returned after a serving a one match suspension and kept four clean sheets in his next seven games, saying that "you learn from every mistake and that is what makes you stronger". He was criticised by Clarke for an error during a win over Barrow on 16 October, but responded by saving a penalty in a 1–1 draw with Mansfield Town three days later. On 15 January 2022, he was sent off for kicking out at Swindon Town's Harry McKirdy after the pair jumped for a high ball moments before half-time during what would finish as a 3–1 home defeat; a furious Clarke said after the match that "he has got to learn from that otherwise he won’t be staying at the club for very long". Covolan, who was suspended for four games for the incident, was supported by captain Tom Conlon, who said "he's one of us, he is a big part of the squad, the boys love him to bits". He was an unused substitute as Vale secured promotion out of the play-offs with victory over Mansfield Town in the final at Wembley Stadium. He played 22 games in the 2021–22 season, keeping seven clean sheets.

Chesterfield (loan)
On 5 July 2022, Covolan returned to the National League to join Chesterfield on a season-long loan deal. On 6 August, he made his debut for the Spireites in a 2–2 draw with Dorking Wanderers, receiving a red card after 28 minutes for an "off-the-ball incident". Manager Paul Cook had stern words for Covolan after the match, saying that "it is something that Lucas will learn from quickly [and] if he doesn’t learn quickly he won't be at the club, it is that simple". Covolan was returned to the starting eleven after Ross Fitzsimons stood in during his suspension, and by September was linked with a permanent move to Chesterfield. However, after making eight further starts he was sidelined with an ankle injury, whilst during Covolan's absence Fitzsimons was praised for his good form.

International career
Covolan spent time with the Brazil under-20 national team, winning two caps in 2010.

Style of play
He has been described as an aggressive goalkeeper who helps the team defend with a high line, though has a tendency to be caught in possession.

Career statistics

Honours
Rio Branco
Campeonato Acreano: 2014

Port Vale
EFL League Two play-offs: 2022

References

1991 births
Living people
Footballers from Curitiba
Brazilian footballers
Brazil under-20 international footballers
CR Vasco da Gama players
Club Athletico Paranaense players
Toledo Esporte Clube players
Clube Esportivo Bento Gonçalves players
Rio Branco Football Club players
Whitehawk F.C. players
Lewes F.C. players
Worthing F.C. players
Torquay United F.C. players
Port Vale F.C. players
Chesterfield F.C. players
Association football goalkeepers
Brazilian expatriate footballers
Brazilian expatriate sportspeople in Spain
Expatriate footballers in Spain
Brazilian expatriate sportspeople in England
Expatriate footballers in England
National League (English football) players
Isthmian League players
Brazilian people of Italian descent
English Football League players